Aan Pillai Singam is a 1975 Indian Tamil-language film, directed by S. P. Muthuraman and produced by Ramachandran. The film stars Sivakumar, Sripriya, Sujatha and M. N. Rajam.

Plot

Cast 

Sivakumar as Rajam's 2nd Son
Sripriya as Sivakumar's Pair
Sujatha as Rajam's servant
M. N. Rajam
Cho as Rajam's 1st Son
Fatafat Jayalakshmi Cho's wife
Suruli Rajan
Senthamarai as Rajam's Husband
Vijayakumar as Sujatha's Husband
S. A. Ashokan
Typist Gopu

Soundtrack 
The music was composed by Vijaya Bhaskar.

Reception 
Kanthan of Kalki criticised the story, but praised Muthuraman's direction.

References

External links 
 

1970s Tamil-language films
1975 films
Films directed by S. P. Muthuraman
Films scored by Vijaya Bhaskar